Setamiyeh or Sattamiyeh or Settamiyeh may refer to:
 Setamiyeh-ye Bozorg
 Setamiyeh-ye Kuchek